Harry McLoughlin (born 1956 in Sligo) is an Irish former footballer.

A local who grew up in the area of Sligo Town which gave Rovers its heart in the early years, Forthill. Harry played his early football with the now defunct Boys Club, which was based behind the old Cavendish's shop on O'Connell Street. He was an old fashioned winger who loved nothing better than to get on the ball, take on the defence and get his crosses in. He also had a good eye for a goalscoring chance. Harry joined Sligo Rovers in the 1977/78 season as a replacement for another local hero, Paul McGee.

He made his League of Ireland debut for the club away to Shamrock Rovers at Glenmalure Park on 9 October 1977 
and on his home debut he made an instant impact tormenting the Galway Rovers defence at the Showground. He went on to make 315 appearances for Sligo Rovers and scored just short of fifty goals for the club, not bad for a winger. He tormented many more defences after this. Harry Mc Loughlin would have made the top 100 easily but the little winger had to do it in style. Harry produced what is arguably the greatest single moment in the history of the club.

It was Easter Sunday at a rain drenched Dalymount Park. Against all odds Sligo Rovers had hauled themselves back into the FAI Cup Final with a goal from Tony Stenson. With barely fifteen minutes to go Graham Fox broke up a Bohs attack and his sliding tackle saw the ball fall to Tony Stenson. He moved the ball along the front of Rovers penalty area to Martin Mc Donnell who sent a brilliant pass down the left wing to Mc Loughlin. He raced onto the ball and took on the Bohs full back Dave Connell. He jinked inside and sent a beautifully judged chip over the head of Dermot O'Neill and into the far corner. As the RTÉ commentator of the time said - "It was a goal worthy of winning any Cup final". It was the goal that would bring the Cup to Sligo for the first time after five Cup final defeats.

He finished off his career with brief spells with Finn Harps and Longford Town. When Sligo Rovers fans sit down to pick their greatest team of all time the name of Harry Mc Loughlin always fills the right wing position.

He was joint top scorer in the 1985/86 First Division .

His nephew Keith made one appearance in the Irish News Cup in 1996/97. Another nephew is Alan Cawley.

Honours
 FAI Cup
 Sligo Rovers 1983

References

1956 births
Living people
People from Sligo (town)
Association footballers from County Sligo
Republic of Ireland association footballers
Association football wingers
League of Ireland players
Sligo Rovers F.C. players
Finn Harps F.C. players
Longford Town F.C. players